Don't Forget the Struggle, Don't Forget the Streets was the first full-length album from New York hardcore (NYHC) band, Warzone.

Following the band's 1987 debut release, the Lower East Side Crew EP, it was first released on the band's own label, Fist Records, before being licensed and re-released in 1988 on Caroline Records, The track "We're The Crew" was previously available on the EP, but was re-recorded for this album.

In 1994, Another Planet re-issued the album on the same disc as Open Your Eyes, something the label did with similar NYHC bands of the same era, such as Murphy's Law, Cro-Mags, and Leeway.

Revelation Records reissued the album with its original artwork in 2016.

Overview
The music on this album was what New York hardcore (and hardcore in general) became known for:  short, fast songs with shouted socio-political lyrics, heavy but basic guitar riffs, gang chants, and attitude. The title track became a slogan for hardcore youth, and one of the most covered tracks by other New York hardcore bands. Other songs such as "Crazy But Not Insane" and "As One" had a similar impact.

The band encountered many controversies after the release of this album, partly because the cover, which looked like an iron cross, could have political connotations — particularly since the band and many of their fans had a skinhead appearance. Raybeez explained that being a skinhead in the U.S. had a different meaning than in Europe; American hardcore skinheads were patriotic, but not racist. The song "Skinhead Youth" was about unity and brotherhood, rather than alienation and violence.

The production quality was DIY, and the musicianship, which the band even admits was not a priority, is pure punk (i.e. basic). The liner notes include the line: "Hardcore music is a movement — not a business."

Track listing
All songs written by Warzone
"Intro Bust"	–	2:11
"It's Your Choice"	–	1:50
"Crazy But Not Insane"	–	2:14
"Fuck Your Attitude"	–	1:27
"As One"	–	1:50
"We're the Crew"	–	2:03
"Don't Forget the Struggle, Don't Forget the Streets"	–	2:36
"In the Mirror"	–	2:42
"Skinhead Youth"	–	1:24
"Growing Up, the Next Step"	–	2:53
"Judgement Day"	–	1:25
"Fighting for Our Country"	–	3:04

Personnel 
 Raymond "Raybeez" Barbieri – vocals
 Paul – guitar
 Crazy "Jay" Skin ( Jay Vento ) – guitar
 John "Omen" – bass
 Lukie Luke – drums
 Recorded August, 1987 at Studio X, Ridgewood, New Jersey, USA
 Produced by Warzone Posse and Fink
 Engineered by Rick Reineke
 Re-issue mastered by Alan Douches at West Westside Music

Notes

External links
Victory Records bands page - Warzone are in Archives at page bottom
Raybeez memorial

1988 albums
Warzone (band) albums
Caroline Records albums